Littorina sitkana is a species of small sea snail, a marine gastropod mollusc in the family Littorinidae, the winkles. It is commonly found in the high tidal zone and the splash zone.

Description

The shell of this winkle has about ten coarse spiral ribs on the last whorl, and has fine spiral microstriae in the gaps between the ribs.  Occasionally this ribbing may be missing or it may be ribbed only at the base. The species with which it is most likely to be confused is Littorina subrotundata  and comparison of the capsule gland of the pallial oviduct is the best way to distinguish between them.

Distribution
The native range of L. sitkana is the coasts of Siberia, Japan and the Pacific coast of North America extending from Alaska to Oregon.

References

Littorinidae
Marine molluscs of Asia
Marine molluscs of North America
Molluscs of the Pacific Ocean
Western North American coastal fauna
Molluscs of Japan
Gastropods of New Zealand
Gastropods described in 1846